Ernest Louis Octave Courtot de Cissey (1810–1882) was a French general and Prime Minister.

de Cissey was born in Paris, educated at the Prytanée National Militaire and, after passing through St Cyr, entered the army in 1832, becoming captain in 1839.
He saw active service in Algeria, and became chef d'escadron in 1849 and lieutenant-colonel in 1850. He took part as a colonel in the Crimean War, and after the battle of Inkerman received the rank of general of brigade.

In 1863 he was promoted general of division. When the Franco-German War broke out in 1870, de Cissey was given a divisional command in the Army of the Rhine, and he was included in the surrender of Bazaine's army at Metz. He was released from captivity only at the end of the war, and on his return was at once appointed by the Versailles government to a command in the army engaged in the suppression of the Commune.

From July 1871 de Cissey sat as a deputy, and he had already become minister of war. He occupied this post several times during the critical period of the reorganization of the French army, and served briefly as Prime Minister of France from 1874 to 1875. In 1875, he was elected senator for life. In 1880, whilst holding the command of the XI corps at Nantes, he was accused of having relations with a certain Baroness Lucie von Kaulla (1840–1891?), a descendant of Karoline Kaulla, who was said to be a spy in the pay of Germany, and he was in consequence relieved from duty. An inquiry subsequently held resulted in de Cissey's favour (1881).

Cissey's Ministry, 22 May 187410 March 1875
Ernest Courtot de Cissey – President of the Council and Minister of War
Louis Decazes – Minister of Foreign Affairs
Oscar Bardi de Fourtou – Minister of the Interior
Pierre Magne – Minister of Finance
Adrien Tailhand – Minister of Justice
Louis Raymond de Montaignac de Chauvance – Minister of Marine and Colonies
Arthur de Cumont – Minister of Public Instruction, Fine Arts, and Worship
Eugène Caillaux – Minister of Public Works
Louis Grivart – Minister of Agriculture and Commerce

Changes
20 July 1874 – The Baron de Chabaud-Latour succeeds Fourtou as Minister of the Interior.  Pierre Mathieu-Bodet succeeds Magne as Minister of Finance.

References

External links
Les députés français depuis 1789: Ernest de Cissey

1810 births
1882 deaths
Politicians from Paris
French nobility
Orléanists
Prime Ministers of France
French Ministers of War
Members of the National Assembly (1871)
French life senators
French generals
French military personnel of the Crimean War
French military personnel of the Franco-Prussian War
Grand Croix of the Légion d'honneur
Burials at Père Lachaise Cemetery